Bad Boys is a 1983 American coming-of-age crime drama film set in a juvenile detention center, starring Sean Penn, Esai Morales, and Clancy Brown, Alan Ruck and Ally Sheedy in their film debuts. The film is directed by Rick Rosenthal. The original music score was composed by Bill Conti.

Plot
Mick O'Brien is a 16-year-old Irish-American hoodlum from Chicago. Mick's crimes include snatching purses, shoplifting,  vandalism, and fighting, but he aspires to bigger things. Mick's attempt to rip off his Puerto Rican rival, Paco Moreno, goes awry, leading to Mick's best friend Carl being fatally shot and Mick accidentally running over and killing Paco's eight-year-old brother.

Mick is sent to the Rainford Juvenile Correctional Facility. Most of the supervisors there have lowered themselves to the role of zookeepers. One exception is Ramon Herrera, a former gang member who talks tough to the inmates, but holds out hope for some of them, especially Mick.

Mick's cellmate is Barry Horowitz, a small, wiry, brainy Jewish kid who firebombed a bowling alley after some boys there assaulted him for flirting with their girlfriends. Their cell block is dominated by a pair of brawny sadists named "Viking" Lofgren and Warren "Tweety" Jerome, who take an immediate dislike to Mick. Mick puts up with them at first, but after witnessing Tweety kill another inmate (who tried to stab Tweety as revenge for raping him), he refuses to be intimidated.

Suspecting that Mick may have revealed Tweety's guilt to the authorities, Tweety and Viking go to Mick's cell to confront him. Mick beats them up with a pillowcase full of unopened soda cans. His victory earns him the respect of the block and recognition as the new "barn boss." Tweety is released soon afterwards and is later killed during a liquor store robbery.

In order to avenge his brother's death, Paco attacks and rapes Mick's girlfriend, J.C. After learning of this, Mick and Horowitz escape. While running through the woods, Horowitz falls on some barbed wire and is caught by two supervisors who were on their trail. This gives Mick time to get away. Ramon rightfully believes that Mick will go J.C.'s house and soon picks him up there. Before returning to Rainford, Ramon takes Mick to visit a maximum-security prison to show him where he could end up if he continues down the same path.

Paco is arrested and winds up in the same dormitory as Mick. Rainford staff are fully aware of the potential danger, but no other reform school has a vacancy. Paco attempts to provoke Mick into a fight, but Mick avoids the confrontation, since he may qualify for early release if he stays out of trouble. However, he also loses the respect of many of the inmates, who now want to see Paco put Mick away.

In an attempt to retaliate on Mick's behalf, Horowitz creates a bomb by planting fertilizer in a radio that he places in the cell Paco and Viking share. The charge explodes prematurely and only injures Viking. Horowitz is condemned to solitary confinement for the remainder of his sentence, a fate he fears more than any other.

When Paco accidentally learns he is being transferred to another facility the next day, he decides to kill Mick that night. While Ramon is on night watch, Paco fakes a ruptured appendix, knocks Ramon unconscious, and locks him in the office. Paco then goes to Mick's cell to stab him with a shiv. Mick gets the jump on Paco, however, and they start fighting. The other inmates are awakened by the brawl and some barricade the door to the dormitory. Eventually, Mick gets on top of Paco and prepares to deliver a fatal stab wound with the shiv while being encouraged by the others to kill. But Mick resists at the last second and stabs the floor mat instead. He then drags a beaten Paco to the supervisors and heads back to his cell, crying in remorse.

Cast
 Sean Penn as Mick O'Brien
 Esai Morales as Paco Moreno
 Ally Sheedy as J.C. Walenski
 Reni Santoni as Ramon Herrera
 Eric Gurry as Barry Horowitz
 Jim Moody as Gene Daniels
 Clancy Brown as "Viking" Lofgren
 Robert Lee Rush as Warren "Tweety" Jerome
 John Zenda as Supervisor Wagner
 Alan Ruck as Carl Brennan
 Rick Rosenthal (cameo) as Judge

Production
The idea for the film came from producer Richard Solo who told writer Richard Di Lello he was looking for "a Jimmy Cagney story set in a modern day reform school." Di Lello produced a ten-page treatment which Solo liked. He gave the approval to do a screenplay. Di Lello spent about a year writing the screenplay which he says later mostly came from his imagination, with minimal research; he later did research and found it corresponded with what he had written. "My imagination turned out to be far more accurate than I ever anticipated," he said.

Solo hired Rick Rosenthal to direct. Rosenthal later said when he first read the script, "I got to page 90, when there'd been a little kid killed, and I said to myself, 'This is reality, but I can't do this, there's just no redeeming value in the whole thing.'... I got to the end. I accepted. Some script changes were made - I think the script was humanized. It's still a hard film, a tough film, but with soul underneath, and I think with social comment that doesn't hit you on the head."

The script was violent but the filmmakers felt this was necessary to tell the story accurately. "I'm a commercial filmmaker first and foremost," said Solo. "This movie is about young people and the youth audience is the primary one. I simply wanted Bad Boys to have a tremendous reality. How do you tell this story without violence? If you don't, you're saying violence doesn't exist."

Finance was obtained from EMI Films.

Casting
Rick Rosenthal says Matt Dillon wanted to play the lead role, but the director was reluctant. He cast Sean Penn on the basis of a reading. "Although I'm crazy about Matt Dillon as an actor, I thought he'd already done the role in My Bodyguard," said Rosenthal. "I was also afraid that the audience might be conscious of a new movie star, where with Penn they'd only be conscious of Mick." The director said Penn is "a very good actor, obsessively so. He went into character for the whole shoot and stayed there, had a real wolf's head tattooed on his arm, checked into hotels as Mick, the whole thing."

It was Ally Sheedy's first role in a feature. "Rick really took a chance on me, he really did," she said.

Shooting
While filming the escape scene, actor Sean Penn broke an ankle which halted shooting for three months.

The film unit spent six days filming in St Charles, IL, a suburb west of Chicago. They employed about 40 residents as extras.

Release

Distribution
Universal Studios originally released Bad Boys in 1983, and Thorn/EMI released it on its videocassettes in 1984, but in 1999 Artisan Entertainment took the rights and released the DVD. In 2001, Anchor Bay Entertainment took its DVD rights and re-released it, and in 2007 Facets Multimedia Distribution re-released it on its DVDs. Bad Boys was released on Blu-ray by Lionsgate Home Entertainment for the first time on February 1, 2011, presented "complete and uncut." It is also available for online streaming video rentals and digital download files purchases through Amazon Video and Apple iTunes Store.

Critical reception
Bad Boys garnered generally positive reviews; review aggregate website Rotten Tomatoes currently holds a 90% "Fresh" rating based on 20 reviews. David Denby of The New Yorker magazine argued, "Bad Boys is never less than tense and exciting, but it's coarse and grisly, an essentially demagogic piece of work".

In his original review, Roger Ebert praised the direction and cinematography in particular and wrote, "The direction, by Richard Rosenthal, is sure-footed, confident and fluid; we are in the hands of a fine director". In her review for The New York Times, Janet Maslin wrote, "Sean Penn's performance is the chief thing that separates Bad Boys from mere exploitation". Perry Seibert of All Media Guide said "Bad Boys proves that great performances can overcome routine story lines."

Rosenthal later said "I think I turned down around 20 or 22 films after 'Bad Boys.' The phone rang all the time. The funny thing is, at the time I didn't know I was hot. But after 'American Dreamer,' I knew the difference."

Soundtrack
The soundtrack of the film comprised some late, eccentric funk tracks, as well as Billy Squier and Iron Maiden.
 "Get Dressed" by George Clinton
 "Superstar" by T-Connection
 "Tonight's the Night" by T-Connection
 "Too Hot to Be Cool" by Ebonee Webb
 "Everybody Wants You" by Billy Squier
 "In the Dark" by Billy Squier
 "Mr. Hate" by The Tubes
 "Check Us Out" by Light of the World
 "Street Corner" by Ashford & Simpson
 "One More Time" by McFadden & Whitehead
 "Give Me Your Love" by Peabo Bryson
 "Prodigal Son" by Iron Maiden
 "Purgatory" by Iron Maiden
 "Don't Go Away" by Melba Moore
 "Night Owls" by Little River Band
 "Man on Your Mind" by Little River Band 
 "Crime Wave" by Prism
 "Run to Her" by Jennifer Warnes
 "Pelo de Alambre" by Bobby Capó
 "Guillermo y Maria" by Bobby Capó

Cultural usage
The name of the Croatian ultras group Bad Blue Boys (who support NK Dinamo Zagreb) is said to have been inspired by Bad Boys.

References

External links
 
 
 
 

1983 films
1980s coming-of-age drama films
1983 crime drama films
1980s prison films
American coming-of-age drama films
American crime drama films
American prison drama films
1980s English-language films
Films about rape
Films directed by Rick Rosenthal
Films scored by Bill Conti
Films set in Chicago
Films shot in Chicago
Films set in Illinois
Films shot in Illinois
Universal Pictures films
EMI Films films
1980s American films